The Madagascar day gecko (Phelsuma madagascariensis madagascariensis) is a diurnal species of gecko. It lives on the eastern coast of Madagascar and typically inhabits rainforests and dwells on trees. The Madagascar day gecko feeds on insects, fruit and nectar.

Scientific synonyms 
Gekko madagascariensis Gray 1831 
Phelsuma sarrube [Wiegmann 1834] 
Phelsuma madagascariensis martensi Mertens 1962 
Phelsuma madagascariensis - Glaw & Vences 1994: 290

Appearance 

This lizard is one of the largest living day geckos. The body color is light green or bluish green. The skin between the scales often has a light color. A rust-coloured stripe extends from the nostril to behind the eye. On the back there are brownish or red-brick coloured dots which may form a thin line along the mid back. These geckos do not have eyelids, and they have flattened toe pads.

Habitat 
P. m. magascariensis is often found on trees along the edges of forests. They also inhabit local huts and banana trees in the east coast of Madagascar because it has a humid and warm climate.

Diet 
These day geckos feed on many arthropods (insects and arachnids) as well as some fruit matter (mashed). They also like to lick hard, tart fruit, pollen and nectar.

Behavior 
Like most Phelsuma spec., the males can be quite quarrelsome and do not accept other males in their neighbourhood. In captivity, where the females cannot escape, the males can also sometimes seriously wound a female. In this case the male and female must be separated.

Reproduction 
The mating season is between November and the first weeks of April. During this period, the females lay up to 6 pairs of eggs. At a temperature of 28 °C, the young will hatch after approximately 55 days. The juveniles measure 55–60 mm.
Madagascar day geckos engage in a mating ritual in which sexually mature males approach the sexually mature females and attach to them with their teeth. When the courtship is complete, they will both lick their vents and let out a small noise.

Care and maintenance in captivity 
These animals should be housed alone, because they are highly territorial. Male and female pairs can get along but it is common that males harass females too much. They need a large, well planted terrarium. 
The temperature should be between 25 and 28 °C. On warm spot temperature should be 35-40 °C. The humidity at night should be maintained between 75 and 90%, on daytime between 60 and 80% In captivity, these animals can be fed with crickets, wax moth larvae, fruit flies, mealworms and houseflies. Fresh tropical fruits, honey and fruity baby foods are good to maintain their inner moisture.

Gallery

References 

Henkel, F.-W. and W. Schmidt (1995) Amphibien und Reptilien Madagaskars, der Maskarenen, Seychellen und Komoren. Ulmer Stuttgart. 
McKeown, Sean (1993) The general care and maintenance of day geckos. Advanced Vivarium Systems, Lakeside CA.

Phelsuma
Endemic fauna of Madagascar
Reptiles described in 1831
Taxa named by John Edward Gray